The National Intelligence Co-ordinating Committee (NICOC) is the organisation responsible for co-ordinating the actions and activities of all of South African intelligence agencies, and collating the intelligence information received from them. It reports to Cabinet level via the Minister of State Security, and is similar to the British Joint Intelligence Committee.

Role of the Committee
The functions of the National Intelligence Co-ordinating Committee, as outlined in the document in 2008 by the Ministerial Review Commission on Intelligence, are to:
 Co-ordinate the intelligence collected by the South African intelligence services;
 Interpret the intelligence collected to identify and detect threats to South African national security;
 co-ordinate and prioritise intelligence activities within the national intelligence structures;
 prepare and interpret intelligence estimates;
 make recommendations to Cabinet on intelligence priorities.

Committee Structure
The South African General Intelligence Laws Amendment Bill, 2011, sets out the structure of NICOC as:
 The Co-ordinator for Intelligence.
 The Director-General of the State Security Agency.
 The Director or Head of the domestic intelligence division known previously as the National Intelligence Agency.
 The Director or Head of the foreign intelligence division known previously as the South African Secret Service.
 The Head of the Crime Intelligence Division of the South African Police Service.
 The Chief of the South African National Defence Force Intelligence Division.
 The Director of the Financial Intelligence Centre.

Current status
On 3 September 2014, State Security Minister David Mahlobo announced that the Head of the National Intelligence Co-ordinating Committee Dennis Dlomo, appointed to the role in 2013, has been “redeployed” to the Department of International Relations and Cooperation.

Co-ordinators for Intelligence
The following people have held the position of Co-ordinator since the restructure of the South African intelligence services in 1994:
 1995 – 1996 Mo Shaik
 1996 – 2001 Linda Mti
 2001 – 2005 Jeff Maqetuka
 2005 – 2007 Barry Gilder
 2007 – ???? Silumko Sokupa.
 2013 – 2014 Dennis Dlomo 
 2015 - 2016 Dr Clinton Swemmer (PhD) (acting?)
 2016 - 2017 Dr Mike Masiapato (PhD) (acting)
 2017 - to date Ambassador Gab Msimang

References

External links
 NIA pages, see "The Intelligence Community"

South African intelligence agencies
Intelligence analysis agencies